Albuquerque Civic Auditorium was an indoor arena in Albuquerque, New Mexico.  It opened in 1957, and was demolished in 1986. It was notable for its innovative construction, as the dome was created by done the changes pouring concrete over a mound of packed earth that was subsequently removed. The auditorium was located east of Downtown on Grand Avenue (now Dr. Martin Luther King Jr. Ave.), between St. Joseph Hospital and Interstate 25. It opened in 1957 and had a capacity of 6,000 people.

History
The Albuquerque Civic Auditorium was designed by the Albuquerque firm of Ferguson, Stevens and Associates in 1955. Architects Gordon Ferguson and Donald Stevens came up with the idea of using an earthen mound as a form for the poured-in-place concrete dome. An existing hill on the site was built up and shaped to the proper dimensions, followed by a ten-day concrete pour. The earth was then excavated from under the dome to create the arena space. The innovative construction technique garnered a mention in Life and was also praised by Frank Lloyd Wright during a lecture at the University of New Mexico in 1956.

The venue opened on April 27, 1957, with a performance by the Albuquerque Civic Symphony. Over the years the venue hosted a number of notable acts, including Led Zeppelin in 1969 and Jimi Hendrix in 1970, just three months before his death. It was also the home venue of the University of Albuquerque Dons basketball team from 1963 to 1969. However, the auditorium had poor acoustics and eventually fell from popularity as a music venue in favor of Tingley Coliseum and Popejoy Hall. It was demolished in 1986.

References

1987 disestablishments in New Mexico
1957 establishments in New Mexico
Demolished music venues in the United States
Music venues in New Mexico
Basketball venues in New Mexico
Defunct indoor arenas in the United States
Indoor arenas in New Mexico
Sports venues completed in 1957
Sports venues demolished in 1986
Sports venues in Albuquerque, New Mexico
Defunct sports venues in New Mexico
Demolished sports venues in the United States
Demolished buildings and structures in New Mexico